is a 2018 Japanese television drama series starring Hana Sugisaki, Sho Hirano and Taishi Nakagawa. It is based on the shōnen manga series Boys Over Flowers Season 2, written and illustrated by Yoko Kamio. The series aired on Tokyo Broadcasting System from 17 April to 26 June 2018 every Tuesdays at 22:00.

Synopsis
The story is set ten years after the original F4 graduated. Since their departure, the school has been on a steady decline.
 is thus formed at the high school by Haruto Kaguragi and his 4 friends. Their goal is to find deadbeat students and kick them out of the school.

Haruto Kaguragi is the most popular boy at Eitoku Academy. However, he secretly orders self-help items online to become strong. Oto Edogawa is a female student at Eitoku who pretends to be rich in order to fit in when in reality, she is impoverished. She works part-time at a convenience store, when one night she sees Haruto Kaguragi coming into the store picking up the items he had purchased. Both are shocked to see each other. The next day, they confront each other and agree to keep each other's secrets.

Much like the original series, Kaguragi ends up falling for Edogawa when she puts him in his place during a party.  It is unfortunate for Kaguragi though as Edogawa is engaged to Hase Tenma, the student body president of Eitoku's rival academy, Momonozono.

Cast
Main Characters

Hana Sugisaki as Oto Edogawa
Sho Hirano as  Haruto Kaguragi
Taishi Nakagawa as Tenma Hase
Tatsuomi Hamada as Kaito Taira
Mio Imada as Airi Maya
Marie Iitoyo as Megumi Nishidome
Jin Suzuki as Issa Narumiya
Keisuke Nakata as Sugimaru Eibi
Cameo Appearances

Jun Matsumoto as Domyouji Tsukasa    (Episode 1)
Shun Oguri as Hanazawa Rui          (Episode 3)
Shota Matsuda as Nishikado Sojiro (Episode 10)

References

External links

Boys Over Flowers
TBS Television (Japan) dramas
2018 Japanese television series debuts
2018 Japanese television series endings
Japanese television dramas based on manga